During the 1976–77 English football season, Brentford competed in the Football League Fourth Division. After a poor start to the season, Bill Dodgin Jr. appointed to replace inexperienced manager John Docherty. With re-election looking likely, Dodgin overhauled the playing squad and the Bees won 14 of the final 18 matches of the season to complete a remarkable turnaround and finish in mid-table.

Season summary 

After Brentford's lowest-ever finish in the Fourth Division at the end of the previous season, manager John Docherty released defenders Alan Nelmes and Keith Lawrence and replaced them with John Fraser and Bobby Goldthorpe respectively. Also arriving at Griffin Park were defender Keith Pritchett and midfielder Steve Aylott, while teenagers Danis Salman, Gary Rolph, Graham Cox and Paul Walker all signed apprentice professional contracts. A catalogue of injuries to Fraser, Aylott, Riddick, Sweetzer, McCulloch, Allen and Johnson and a failure to win any of the first six games of the season led to manager Docherty quitting the club, after failing to win a vote of confidence from chairman Dan Tana. Physiotherapist Eddie Lyons was put in caretaker charge of the team for one match before Bill Dodgin Jr. was appointed manager on 16 September 1976, who followed in his father's footsteps by taking over the role.

While Brentford were entrenched in the re-election places the first five months of Bill Dodgin Jr.'s reign, behind the scenes he overhauled the squad and sought players who would meld with his attacking philosophy. Between September 1976 and February 1977, Dodgin brought in midfielder Dave Carlton from his previous club Northampton Town and a number of players on loan – goalkeeper Tony Burns and midfielders Allan Glover, Steve Scrivens, Neil Smillie and John Bain. The sales of defender Keith Pritchett and forwards Roger Cross and Micky French generated over £20,000 in transfer fees, a small portion of which was spent on midfielders Paul Shrubb and Steve Phillips. Most significantly, teenage forward Gordon Sweetzer was promoted through the ranks and began to establish himself in the starting lineup in the New Year.

By January 1977, manager Dodgin's new-look squad was starting to produce results on the field, with Gordon Sweetzer scoring a hat-trick in a 4–0 victory over Stockport County in the middle of the month. In late February, Brentford set off on a run which would see the club become one of the Fourth Division's form teams, winning 14 and drawing two of the final 18 matches of the season. Gordon Sweetzer established a strike partnership with fit-again Andrew McCulloch and showed prolific form, finishing the season with 23 goals from 28 appearances. In March, despite a shaky start, the £20,000 purchase of central defender Pat Kruse would prove to be an important signing for the future. Brentford finished the season in 15th place.

Two club records were set during the season:
 Youngest debutant: Paul Walker, 15 years, 7 months, 28 days (versus Watford, League Cup first round, 14 August 1976)
 Youngest FA Cup goalscorer: Gary Rolph – 16 years, 9 months, 26 days (versus Colchester United, FA Cup second round, 20 December 1976)

League table

Results
Brentford's goal tally listed first.

Legend

Pre-season

Football League Fourth Division

FA Cup

Football League Cup 

 Sources: 100 Years of Brentford, The Big Brentford Book of the Seventies, Statto

Playing squad 
Players' ages are as of the opening day of the 1976–77 season.

 Sources: The Big Brentford Book of the Seventies, Timeless Bees

Coaching staff

John Docherty (14 August – 7 September 1976)

Eddie Lyons (7 – 16 September 1976)

Bill Dodgin Jr. (16 September 1976 – 14 May 1977)

Statistics

Appearances and goals
Substitute appearances in brackets.

Players listed in italics left the club mid-season.
Source: 100 Years of Brentford

Goalscorers 

Players listed in italics left the club mid-season.
Source: 100 Years of Brentford

Management

Summary

Transfers & loans

Awards 
 Supporters' Player of the Year: Gordon Sweetzer
 Players' Player of the Year: Jackie Graham

References 

Brentford F.C. seasons
Brentford